Isabel Abreu (born 3 March 1978 Arronches, Portugal) is a Portuguese actress and TV presenter.

Abreu's film credits include Uma Vida à Espera and Entre os Dedos.  Her television credits include Rainha das Flores Os Boys and Pai à Força.

Abreu is married to director Tiago Guedes.

References

External links 

1978 births
Living people
People from Portalegre District
Portuguese film actresses
Golden Globes (Portugal) winners